The crowned false boa (Pseudoboa coronata) is a species of snake in the family Colubridae. The species is endemic to South America.

Geographic range
P. coronata is found in Bolivia, Brazil, Colombia, Ecuador, French Guiana, Guyana, Peru, Suriname, and Venezuela.((Tobago))

Reproduction
P. coronata is oviparous.

References

Further reading
Boulenger GA (1896). Catalogue of the Snakes in the British Museum (Natural History). Volume III., Containing the Colubridæ (Opisthoglyphae and Proteroglyphæ) ... London: Trustees of the British Museum (Natural History). (Taylor and Francis, printers). xiv + 727 pp. + Plates I-XXV. (Oxyrhopus coronatus, pp. 111–112).
Costa, Henrique Caldeira; Cotta, Giselle Agostini; MacCulloch, Ross D. (2015). "New easternmost and southernmost records of Pseudoboa coronata Schneider, 1801 (Serpentes: Dipsadidae: Pseudoboini), with a distribution map". Check List 11 (3): Article 1624, pp. 1–7.
Schneider JG (1801). Historiae Amphibiorum naturalis et literariae Fasciculus Secundus continens Crocodilos, Scincos, Chamaesaurus, Boas, Pseudoboas, Elaps, Angues, Amphisbaenas et Caecilias. Jena: F. Frommann. vi + 374 pp. + Plates I-II. (Pseudoboa coronata, new species, p. 286). (in Latin, with some French in Addenda).

Colubrids
Snakes of South America
Fauna of the Amazon
Reptiles of Bolivia
Reptiles of Brazil
Reptiles of Colombia
Reptiles of Ecuador
Reptiles of French Guiana
Reptiles of Guyana
Reptiles of Peru
Reptiles of Suriname
Reptiles of Venezuela
Reptiles described in 1801